Parotis marginata is a species of moth of the family Crambidae. It is known from south-east Asia, including India, Bangladesh and China, as well as Fiji, Japan and Australia, where it is known from the Northern Territory and Queensland.

The wingspan is about 30 mm. They are a deep green, with a crenulated brown line around the edges of each wing.

The larvae feed on Alstonia scholaris, Gardenia jasminoides and Tabernaemontana. Young larvae feed on the flesh of the leaves leaving a skeleton of veins. Later instars have been found feeding on the bark. They are pale green with several raised black lumps on each segment, and a pale brown head. They live in a shelter created from curled or joined leaves held with silk. Pupation takes place in this shelter.

References

External links
CSIRO Ecosystem Sciences - Australian Moths Online

Moths described in 1893
Spilomelinae
Moths of Asia
Moths of Oceania